The 2020 Georgia Bulldogs football team represented the University of Georgia in the 2020 NCAA Division I FBS football season. The Bulldogs played their home games at Sanford Stadium in Athens, Georgia and were led by fifth-year head coach Kirby Smart. For the first time since 2016, the Bulldogs did not win the Eastern Division of the Southeastern Conference (SEC), finishing second behind rival Florida.

Preseason

SEC Media Days
In the preseason media poll, Georgia was predicted to finish in second in the East Division behind Florida. Georgia received the second-most votes (tied with LSU) to win the SEC Championship Game.

Recruiting
Georgia's 2020 college football recruiting class was rated as the best in the country by Rivals.com, 247Sports, and On3. Highly-rated recruits included cornerback Kelee Ringo, defensive tackle Jalen Carter, offensive tackle Broderick Jones and Tate Ratlege, linebacker Mekhail Sherman, and tight end Darnell Washington.

Schedule
Georgia announced its 2020 football schedule on August 7, 2019.

The Bulldogs had games scheduled against East Tennessee State, Georgia Tech, Louisiana–Monroe and Virginia, which were all canceled due to the COVID-19 pandemic. This was the first season since 1924 that the Bulldogs did not play Georgia Tech.

Georgia played two additional SEC West opponents this season: Arkansas and Mississippi State. The game scheduled against SEC East opponent Vanderbilt was postponed and eventually canceled.

Schedule Source:

Roster

Rankings

Game summaries

at Arkansas

No. 7 Auburn

Tennessee

Players drafted into the NFL

Coaching staff

References

Georgia
Georgia Bulldogs football seasons
Peach Bowl champion seasons
Georgia Bulldogs football